Jose Seru (born 9 February 1991) is a Japanese rugby sevens player. He competed in the men's tournament at the 2020 Summer Olympics. Born in Fiji, he moved to Japan in 2013 and became a citizen in 2020.

References

External links
 

1991 births
Living people
Male rugby sevens players
Olympic rugby sevens players of Japan
Rugby sevens players at the 2020 Summer Olympics
Fijian emigrants to Japan
Naturalized citizens of Japan
Japanese people of Fijian descent
Japanese rugby union players
Rugby union locks
Rugby union flankers
Hanazono Kintetsu Liners players